Geoff Holder is a British author. He has written twenty non-fiction books on the paranormal, as well as on unusual and unexplained events and objects. His works include The Jacobites and the Supernatural and 101 Things to Do with a Stone Circle, Scottish Bodysnatchers and nine titles in The Guide to the Mysterious... series, covering subjects throughout Britain.

His work encompasses folklore, archaeology, local history, parapsychology, ghosts, Forteana, neo-antiquarianism, witchcraft, gargoyles and graveyards.

He also actively participates to paranormal investigations as a member of The Ghost Club.

Early life and education
Geoff Holder was born in Cardiff, Wales in 1958, and grew up within the city, before later relocating to Perthshire. Holder cites an interest in dinosaurs, dragons and all things mythological as an inspiration for his future career.

He spent three years studying with the Open University, achieving qualifications in the Humanities, Social Sciences and Popular Culture. This was furthered by a degree in Film and Media studies at the University of Stirling as a mature student, followed by a postgraduate diploma at Duncan of Jordanstone College of Art and Design, Dundee.

Whilst attending Duncan of Jordanstone College of Art and Design, he recreated the story of the Garden of Eden on stop-motion film, using figurines from various sci-fi series to play the roles. The cast included He-Man as Jehovah, a Dalek as Samael, and dinosaurs in various supporting roles.

Career
Throughout his working life, he held jobs including public footpath surveyor, coal shoveller, arts festival assistant, factory worker, fruit picker, civil servant and turkey slaughterhouse worker.

Holder worked as a scriptwriter and producer for production company Speakeasy Productions, in Stanley, Perthshire, writing and producing works including Scotland: The Mysterious Country, a documentary series for STV, and The Mary Millington Story, which aired on Channel 4.

His early work included contributions to the Perthshire Advertiser, submitting the weekly column Mysterious Perthshire. His other early journalistic work included pieces on travel and motorbike culture.

Literary works
The Guide to Mysterious Perthshire was published in December 2006 by Tempus Publishing (now The History Press).

Since then he has written more than twenty books, including Paranormal Dundee, The Guide to Mysterious Skye & Lochalsh, The Guide to Mysterious Glasgow and The Guide to the Mysterious Lake District.

Bibliography
 The Guide to Mysterious Perthshire (2006) 
 The Guide to Mysterious Iona and Staffa (2007) 
 The Guide to Mysterious Loch Ness and the Inverness Area (2007) 
 The Guide to Mysterious Arran (2008) 
 The Guide to Mysterious Stirlingshire (2008) 
 101 Things To Do with a Stone Circle (2009) 
 The Guide to Mysterious Glasgow (2009) 
 The Guide to Mysterious Aberdeenshire (2009) 
 The Guide to the Mysterious Lake District (2009) 
 Perthshire Murders (2009) 
 The Guide to Mysterious Skye and Lochalsh (2010) 
 Haunted Aberdeen and District (2010) 
 Scottish Bodysnatchers: A Gazetteer (2010) 
 The Jacobites and the Supernatural (2010) 
 The Guide to Mysterious Aberdeen (2010) 
 Paranormal Cumbria (2010) 
 Paranormal Perthshire (2010) 
 Paranormal Dundee (2011) 
 Paranormal Glasgow (2011) 
 The Little Book of Glasgow (2011) 
 Bloody Scottish History: Edinburgh (2012)

References

External links
 www.geoffholder.com

1958 births
Living people
Fortean writers
Alumni of the University of Dundee
Alumni of the University of Stirling
Writers from Cardiff
Welsh non-fiction writers
Scottish writers
Welsh occult writers